The Green Eto-Ecologist Party was a Uruguayan green party.

Established in 1987, it obtained 11,000 votes in the 1989 Uruguayan general election, with Dr. Rodolfo Tálice as its presidential candidate. Five years later it obtained 5,000 votes. Afterwards the party almost lost presence, associating itself with the Civic Union.

References

Defunct political parties in Uruguay
Political parties established in 1987
1987 establishments in Uruguay
Green political parties in Uruguay
Environment of Uruguay